(born in 1964) is a Japanese screenwriter and film director.

Career
Born in Iwate Prefecture, Satō attended the Asagaya College of Art and Design before studying filmmaking at the London International Film School. Her 1995 film Wizard of Darkness won the Minami Toshiko Award at the 1995 Yubari International Fantastic Film Festival.

Filmography

Suzy & Lucy (1989) (director)
Tale of a Vampire(1992) (writer, director)
Eko Eko Azarak: Wizard of Darkness (1995) (director)
Eko Eko Azarak 2: Birth of the Wizard (1996) (director)
Resident Evil Code: Veronica/Code: Veronica X (2000-2001, Video game) (CG Movie Sequences Director)
Onimusha: Warlords/Genma Onimusha (2001-2002, Video game) (CG Movie Sequences Director)
Minami-kun no Koibito (2004, TV series) (Director)
Unfair: The Movie (2007) (writer)
K-20: Legend of the Mask (2008) (writer, director)
Ghost: In Your Arms Again (2010) (writer)
Space Battleship Yamato (2010) (writer)
Unfair 2: The Answer (2011) (writer, director)
Unfair: The End (2015) (writer, director)

Notes

References

External links
 

1964 births
Japanese film directors
Japanese screenwriters
Living people
People from Iwate Prefecture
Alumni of the London Film School
Japanese women screenwriters
Japanese women film directors
20th-century Japanese women writers
21st-century Japanese women writers